Ernestine Ygnacio-De Soto (born 1938/1939) is a Barbareño Chumash elder. She is active in documenting the language Barbareño. Additionally she has worked as an illustrator and Chumash historian.

Early life 

Ygnacio-De Soto is the daughter of Mary Yee (1897–1965), who was the last first language speaker of the Chumashan language, Barbareño. She grew up listening to native speakers of the language and therefore serves as a direct living link to that extinct language family.

Her ancestors lived near the area of Painted Cave, California. Some of her family stories, including stories by her maternal great grandmother Luisa Ygnacio, were documented by ethnologist John Peabody Harrington.

Career 
Ygnacio-De Soto has worked closely with archivist John Johnson for over a decade, in documenting family memories and Barbareño Chumash cultural traditions in to writing. They became friends when Johnson was writing his PhD thesis on Chumash marriage and family patterns.

Ygnacio-De Soto was the illustrator of a children's book which tells one of her mother's cultural stories, The Sugar Bear Story (2005), published by Sunbelt Publications in conjunction with the Anthropology Department of the Santa Barbara Museum of Natural History. 

In 2009, she help to co-write a documentary film script with John R. Johnson. The film, 6 Generations: A Chumash Family's History (2010) is about her family's history and was produced by filmmaker Paul Goldsmith. It has been reviewed in the Journal of California and Great Basin Anthropology. The 6 Generations film won several awards at the Archaeology Channel International Film and Video Festival (2012); including Best Film; Best Script; Special Mention, Increasing the Awareness of the Ethnographic Record; and Audience Favorite.

She spoke out in 2019 against a project by the Bacara Resort in Santa Barbara, which aimed to build bathrooms in an area that holds sacred Chumash graves.

The United States National Park Service has devoted a web page to her commentary on Scott O'Dell's book, Island of the Blue Dolphins (1960), in Chapter 7.

Additionally, she has worked as a nurse at a Santa Barbara rest home.

Publications

See also 

 Barbareño language

References

External links 

Film preview: 6 Generations: A Chumash Family's History

1930s births
Year of birth uncertain

Living people
21st-century Native American women
21st-century Native Americans
Linguists of Chumashan languages

Chumash people
20th-century Native American women
20th-century Native Americans
Culture of Santa Barbara, California